The Olsen House is a historic house in Helena, Montana. It has been listed on the National Register of Historic Places since March 22, 1991. It stands opposite St. Peter's Cathedral.

History
The plot of land was purchased in 1874 by Amelia Dissa, and her husband Louis Derrick built a one and a half-story cottage facing Park Avenue. It was built with wood and designed in the Gothic Revival architectural style.

After he died in the late 1870s, she married Ingethen Olsen, an American pioneer who owned a ranch in Fergus County, Montana, but the house remained in her name. By 1884–1885, they built a two-story rectangular addition and a gable. After Olsen died in 1904, his wife replaced the wooden cottage frame with a two-story front built with bluestone; it was completed in 1908–1909. When she died in 1918, the house was inherited by her daughter Amelia M. Olsen, who lived there until 1946.

Four years later, in 1950, the house was purchased by John Conway Harrison, who was elected as a justice of the Montana Supreme Court in 1961. He lived in the house until 1988, and he sold it to Robert Haseman in 1989. The house was later used as offices.

References

Houses on the National Register of Historic Places in Montana
Italianate architecture in Montana
Houses completed in 1885
Houses in Lewis and Clark County, Montana
National Register of Historic Places in Helena, Montana
1885 establishments in Montana Territory